The Lycoming O-360 is a family of four-cylinder, direct-drive, horizontally opposed, air-cooled, piston aircraft engines. Engines in the O-360 series produce between 145 and 225 horsepower (109 to 168 kW), with the basic O-360 producing 180 horsepower.

The engine family has been installed in thousands of aircraft, including the Cessna 172, Piper Cherokee/Archer, Grumman Tiger, and many home-built types. It has a factory rated time between overhaul (TBO) of 2000 hours or twelve years. O-360 family engines are also widely used in airboats, most notably in the Hurricane Aircats used by the US Army during the Vietnam War.

The first O-360 certified was the A1A model, certified on 20 July 1955 to United States CAR 13 effective March 5, 1952 as amended by 13-1 and 13-2.

Series
The O-360 family of engines comprises 167 different models with 12 different prefixes. All have a  displacement and  bore and stroke.

 O-360 carbureted series
 HO-360 horizontally mounted series for helicopter installation
 LO-360 same as O-360, but with left-hand rotating crankshaft, for use in pairs on twin-engined aircraft
 TO-360 turbocharged series
 LTO-360 turbocharged left-hand rotation series
 IO-360 fuel-injected series
 LIO-360  same as IO-360, but with left-hand rotating crankshaft 
 AIO-360 inverted mount (dry sump aerobatic) fuel-injected series
 AEIO-360 aerobatic fuel-injected series
 HIO-360 horizontally mounted fuel-injected series for helicopters
 LHIO-360 left-hand rotation, fuel-injected, horizontally mounted for helicopters
 TIO-360 turbocharged and fuel-injected series

Variants

Applications

O-360

LO-360
Beechcraft Duchess
Piper PA-44-180 Seminole
IO-360

LIO-360

Piper PA-34 Seneca I
Diamond DA42
AIO-360
Stephens Akro
AEIO-360
Aero-Cam Slick 360
Aviat Eagle II
American Champion Super Decathlon
Extra EA-200
FFA AS-202 Bravo
Great Lakes Sport Trainer
Grob G 115E
Mudry CAP 10
Peña Capeña
Pitts Special
Tech Aero TR 200
Valmet L-70 Vinka
Zlín Z 242
HIO-360
Enstrom F-28
OH-23 Raven
Schweizer 300
LHIO-360
Silvercraft SH-3
Silvercraft SH-4

Specifications (O-360-A1A)

See also

References

External links

Lycoming Homepage
 

Boxer engines
O-360
1950s aircraft piston engines